Ana Belén Bernardo Zamora (born 20 March 1976) is an S10 swimmer from Spain.  She has a disability where she is missing or cannot use an arm or leg below the elbow or knee.  She competed at the 1996 Summer Paralympics, winning a bronze medal in the 100 meter Butterfly race and in the 4 x 100 Relay swimming race.  She finished 8th in the 100 meter Freestyle race, and fifth in the 400 meter Freestyle race.

Notes

References

External links 
 
 
 

1976 births
Living people
Spanish female butterfly swimmers
Spanish female freestyle swimmers
Paralympic swimmers of Spain
Paralympic silver medalists for Spain
Paralympic bronze medalists for Spain
Paralympic medalists in swimming
Swimmers at the 1992 Summer Paralympics
Swimmers at the 1996 Summer Paralympics
Medalists at the 1992 Summer Paralympics
Medalists at the 1996 Summer Paralympics
People from Avilés
S10-classified Paralympic swimmers
Medalists at the World Para Swimming Championships
20th-century Spanish women